Goloka or Goloka Vrindavan is the celestial abode of the Hindu god Krishna and his divine consort Radha. In the Bhagavata Purana, Krishna is portrayed as the highest person who resides in Goloka.

According to Gaudiya Vaishnava philosopher Jiva Goswami, Goloka, also called Vrindavan, is the highest spiritual planet and can be further manifested into three abodes, called Mathura, Dvārakā and Gokul, according to the difference in the pastimes and associates of Krishna.

Goloka is mentioned in Gaudiya Vaishnavism, the Swaminarayan Sampradaya, the Pranami Sampraday, Pushtimarg and the Nimbarka Sampradaya, and in scriptures such as the Pancharatra texts, the Garga Samhita, Brahma Samhita, Brahma Vaivarta Purana and Devi-Bhagavata Purana.

Etymology
Goloka literally means "World of cows". The Sanskrit word go refers to "cow" and loka is translated as "realm."

Lord Krishna is also known as Gaulokvihari (vihari means "a resident of") since he is a resident of Goloka and his consort Radha is called Radhika. The Shri Swaminarayan Mandir in Mumbai has two murtis dedicated to this particular form of the gods.

Description 

A description of Goloka can be found in the Brahma Samhita, verse 5.29:

"I worship Govinda, the primeval Lord, the first progenitor, who is tending the cows, yielding all desires, in abodes built with spiritual gems and surrounded by millions of purpose trees. He is always served with great reverence and affection by hundreds and thousands of devotees resembling goddesses of fortune."

Sanatana Goswami, an author of a number of important works in the bhakti tradition of Gaudiya Vaishnavism, states, "Sri Goloka is considered the ultimate destination of spiritual endeavour."

The Brahma Vaivarta Purana explicitly describes Goloka Vrindavan to be about 500 million yojanas (4 billion miles) above Vaikuntha loka and expands till 30 million yojanas (240 million miles). The depiction is similar with a verse found in brahma samhita 5.43. 

Acharyas of Gaudiya Vaishnavaism explains it to be limitless. Both Vaikuntha and Goloka are considered to be Nitya Dhama (eternal realm of existence) which are not prone to annihilation even after the whole cosmic dissolution. Krishna in his two-armed form eternally reside in the realm of Goloka and in his four-armed form, as Vishnu he eternally resides in the realm of Vaikuntha loka.

Literary sources 
Mention of Goloka is also found in other Puranas, such as Skanda Purana and Markandeya Purana. In Brihad-bhagavatamrita, Sanatana Goswami explains this verse is quoted from Skanda Purana and it is spoken by Krishna to Arjuna,

In the Markandeya Purana, Krishna declares,

Goloka Structure 
All the Vaikuntha planets are said to be like petals of a lotus flower, and the principal part of that lotus, called Goloka Vrindāvana, is the center of all the Vaikunthas. Thus the expansions of Krishna in various forms, as well as His various abodes on the spiritual planets in the spiritual sky, are unlimited. Goloka is divided into three different portions: Gokula, Mathurā and Dvārakā. As stated in Brahma-samhitā (5.43), all the Vaikuntha planets in the spiritual sky (known as Vishnuloka) emanate from the predominating deity of Goloka Vrndāvana, known as Svayam Bhagavan.

See also

Radha Krishna
Brahma Samhita
Vaikunta planets

References and notes

Swaminarayan Sampradaya
Gaudiya Vaisnava philosophical concepts
Vaishnavism